Vijayawada–Hyderabad Expressway is a 247 km long, 4 lane wide tolled expressway that connects Vijayawada in Andhra Pradesh with Hyderabad in Telangana. It was opened for public in October 2012. The project was undertaken by concessionaire GMR Hyderabad Vijayawada Expressways Private Limited, a subsidiary of GMR Group on a Build-Own-Operate-Transfer (BOOT) basis. It is one of the busiest expressways in India and is a part of National Highway 65, which connects Machilipatnam to Pune.

History 
In early 2007, National Highways Authority of India (NHAI) has decided to expand the existing two-lane into a four-lane of Vijayawada-Hyderabad section. The project has also been sanctioned in 2007. But, due to technical issues, the project was delayed. Then in 2009, bids were announced by the NHAI. Five bidders were finalized for the construction of the roadway.

GMR Group, one of the 5 bidders for the project got the bid at a concession period of 25 years and incorporated a subsidiary, GMR Hyderabad Vijayawada Expressways Private Limited on 11 June 2009 for this work. The project was completed under this subsidiary.

Construction 

The project was started on 22 March 2010 with an estimated cost . The laying foundation ceremony was held at Narketpally attended by then Chief Minister of Andhra Pradesh, Konijeti Rosaiah, Jaipal Reddy and Ratanjit Pratap Narain Singh. Earlier, three toll gates were set-up, whereas now, there are four. The project was completed in October 2012.

Importance 
After the Bifurcation of Andhra Pradesh, the expressway became a major roadway connecting Hyderabad, capital of Telangana and Vijayawada, capital of Andhra Pradesh. The expressway became a major hub for various businesses. Industrial parks, pharma sectors and other corridors were proposed by both Government of Telangana and Government of Andhra Pradesh.

Exits

Inter-connectivity

Following will either connect or act as an alternative to the Vijayawada-Hyderabad Expressway:

 Mumbai–Nagpur Expressway will connect to expressway will connect to Vijayawada-Hyderabad Expressway at Nagpur.

 Jalna-Nanded Expressway at will aso provide direct connectivity between Vijayawada-Hyderabad Expressway (at Hydrabad) and Mumbai–Nagpur Expressway (at Jalna).

 Nagpur-Vijayawada Expressway is part of Nagpur-Vijayawada Economic Corridor which will connect Nagpur-Chandrapur (part greenfield) to Mancherial-Warangal(greenfield), Warangal-Khammam (greenfield), Khammam-Vijayvada (part greenfield). The tenders were issued in november 2022, would be likely completed by the end of 2024 or mid 2025.

 Hyderabad–Indore Expressway via Nanded-Akola-Omkareshwar-Indore, which will further connect to Delhi-Mumbai Expressway via Kota-Indore Expressway (136 km).

 Raipur–Visakhapatnam Expressway will be an alternative to the Vijayawada Hyderabad Expressway for the access to various ports across the Western Ghats in Bay of Bengal.

See also 

 List of state highways in Andhra Pradesh
 List of National Highways in India by highway number

References

External links 

 GMR Transportation Vijayawada-Hyderabad

Roads in Hyderabad, India
Roads in Vijayawada
Roads in Telangana
Roads in Krishna district
Expressways in Andhra Pradesh
Expressways in Telangana
Toll roads in India
Transport in Krishna district
Transport in Hyderabad, India
Transport in Vijayawada
2012 establishments in Andhra Pradesh